Marc Casal (born August 13, 1987 in Canillo, Andorra) is an Andorran figure skater. He is the 2004 Andorran national champion and three time junior national champion. Along with Melissandre Fuentes, he was the first skater to represent Andorra in an ISU Championship, which they both achieved at the 2002 World Junior Figure Skating Championships.

Competitive highlights 
JGP: Junior Grand Prix

External links
 

1987 births
Living people
Andorran figure skaters
People from Canillo